Sigmund "Sig" Harris (July 2, 1883 – November 8, 1964) was an American college football player. He was University of Minnesota's All-American quarterback in 1902–04, for powerful teams under Dr. Henry L. Williams.   He was also a plucky,   blocking back, punter, punt returner, and defensive safety, and played a critical role in the Little Brown Jug game between Minnesota and Michigan in 1903.

Early life
Born in Dubuque, Iowa, Harris and his family moved to Minneapolis when he was young, where: I went to Cheder.  There was no other organization for Jewish education in those days.  I lived some distance from the Jewish population in town.  I always felt that I considerably missed Jewish life in not being in closer touch with our people.

He played  football for the Minneapolis Central High School team.

College
Harris began his college career in 1901, when he was enrolled at the College of Engineering and Mechanical Arts at the University of Minnesota. He became the starting quarterback the following year. In the 1903 season, Harris was named first team Fielding H. Yost All-American, third team Walter Camp All-American, and first team Camp All-Western. He was present at the game against the Michigan Wolverines where the Little Brown Jug rivalry began. Harris was named third team Camp All-American in the 1904 season.

Coaching
Harris was an assistant coach from graduation until 1920.  He served as a substitute head coach for a game in 1922 when Williams suddenly took ill. He would return to coaching for a brief time, but he was devoted full-time to the machinery business that he founded in 1903 and continued to head until his death in 1964.

Hall of Fame

Harris is a member of the International Jewish Sports Hall of Fame.

See also
List of select Jewish football players

References

1883 births
1964 deaths
American football quarterbacks
Minnesota Golden Gophers football coaches
Minnesota Golden Gophers football players
Sportspeople from Dubuque, Iowa
Jewish American sportspeople
Players of American football from Iowa